Robert "Rob" Roos (born 2 August 1966) is a Dutch politician and a current Member of the European Parliament (MEP). He is a member of the JA21 political party, since leaving the Forum for Democracy (FvD) in 2020.

Roos worked in the telecoms industry before becoming active in politics. He briefly served in the States of South Holland from 28 March 2019 to 4 September 2019, in which he chaired the FvD group. He had been lijsttrekker in the 2019 provincial election. In the 2019 European Parliament election, he was placed second on the list led by Derk Jan Eppink. In the 2019 Senate election, he was placed thirteenth on the list led by Henk Otten.

Roos currently represents JA21 in a Netherlands seat in the EU Parliament. He is vice-chair of the European Conservatives and Reformists Group.

References

External links

  Parlement.com - biography

Living people
1966 births
People from Alblasserdam
MEPs for the Netherlands 2019–2024
Forum for Democracy MEPs
JA21 politicians
21st-century Dutch people